Crane Creek is a stream in the U.S. state of West Virginia. It is a tributary of the Bluestone River.

Crane Creek was named from an incident when a crane was killed near it.

See also
List of rivers of West Virginia

References

Rivers of Mercer County, West Virginia
Rivers of West Virginia